Hoseynabad-e Deh Askar (also Romanized as Ḩoseynābād-e Deh ‘Askar; also known as Ḩoseynābād) is a village in Asfyj Rural District, Asfyj District, Behabad County, Yazd Province, Iran. At the 2006 census, its population was 169, in 42 families.

References 

Populated places in Behabad County